The Tindouf Basin is a major sedimentary basin in West Africa, to the south of the little Atlas region, Morocco.

Description 
In the Ordovician period (490 Ma to 445 Ma) the area was an embayment sloping down from the West African craton into the Tethys Ocean. It became a closed basin in the Late Carboniferous (320 Ma to 300 Ma). The basin has a steep northern edge against the Anti Atlas and more gently sloping southern edge.
These marine formations are overlain by a continental Cretaceous and Pliocene Hamada cover.

Petroleum geology 
The basin may have potential for oil and/or gas production, but has been largely unexplored.

References 

Sedimentary basins of Africa
Geology of Algeria
Geology of Morocco
Geology of Western Sahara
Basins of Africa